The  is an organization that sets automotive standards in Japan, analogous to the Society of Automotive Engineers (SAE) in the United States. JASO also sets standards for grades of oil; the highest grade for two-stroke engines being JASO FD, and JASO MA for four-stroke engines (motorcycles).

M 345 "2-cycle gasoline engine-lubricating oil-performance classification"

It stipulates the lubricating oil used in 2-stroke gasoline engines such as motorcycles, general-purpose machines, and outboard motors, and was established in 1994. For 2-stroke oil, lubricity, cleanliness, exhaust smoke and exhaust system blockage are evaluated by the test methods specified in JASO M 340, M 341, M 342, and M 343, and the grades are FB, FC, and FD. Performance is categorized. FA has been abolished, but the performance classification is positioned as follows.

FA It has the minimum performance for a two-stroke engine.
FB Especially excellent in lubricity and cleanliness compared to FA.
FC Low smoke type with excellent exhaust smoke and exhaust system blockage compared to FB.
FD Improved cleaning performance at high engine temperatures compared to FC.

In addition, FB, FC, and FD of this standard are adopted as EGB, EGC, and EGD, respectively, as ISO standards.

See also
 American Petroleum Institute
 Society of Automotive Engineers

References

External links 
 JASO standards
 JSAE (parent organization)

Standards organizations in Japan
Trade associations based in Japan
Automotive standards